= Stylumia =

Fashion based software company

- Type: Private
- Industry: Software as a service
- Founded: December 2015
- Founder: Ganesh Subramanian
- Headquarters: Bangalore, India
- Area served: Worldwide
- Key people: Ganesh Subramanian (CEO)
- Services: AI for Fashion; Retail Intelligence
- Parent: Stylumia Intelligence Technology Private Limited
- Website: www.stylumia.ai

Stylumia is an Indian software as a service company based in Bangalore, Karnataka. Stylumia is better known for providing artificial intelligence-driven fashion analytics tools to apparel industries.

== Formation and services ==
In 2015, Stylumia was founded by an entrepreneur, Ganesh Subramanian. Since its inception, the company has developed several market Intelligence tools for fashion industry. In 2016, Stylumia introduced artificial intelligence based tools for fashion trend forecasting, demand prediction, predictive distribution and design generation. In 2017, Stylumia expanded their business to Europe. In 2020, Stylumia expanded their business to North America.

Stylumia has helped "reduce fashion industry's carbon footprints by 60 million garments per annum." The company has been recognised for its sustainability efforts and was chosen as one of the six circular change makers in 2019.

In 2019, Stylumia was selected for the Target Accelerator Program to support Target's global business strategy.

== Recognition ==
- Nasscom Emerge50 Product, 2019
- Amazon AI Conclave Award – Retail, 2019
- Circular Changemaker by Fashion for Good, 2019
- Aegis Graham Bell Award
